Mario Baroni (11 March 1927 – 1 August 1994) was an Italian racing cyclist. He won stage 14 of the 1957 Giro d'Italia.

Major results
1956
1st Stage 1 Ronde van Nederland
6th Milan–San Remo
1957
1st Stage 12 Vuelta a España
1st Stage 14 Giro d'Italia

References

External links
 

1927 births
1994 deaths
Italian male cyclists
Italian Giro d'Italia stage winners
Place of birth missing
Sportspeople from the Metropolitan City of Florence
Cyclists from Tuscany